Fane is an English surname of Welsh origins that belongs to a family who have produced a number of notable members. The family originated with Ivon Vane, who was a Welsh landowner and mercenary captain in the service of the Black Prince. Ivon Vane or John Fane, as he was known in English, was one of three captains who captured King John II of France at the battle of Poitiers 1356. He was knighted and shared in the ransom monies, which made him very wealthy. He settled in Kent and founded the two notable families of Fane, whose members became the Earls of Westmoreland, and Vane, who became the Earls of Darlington. Both families have golden gauntlets on their crest in memory of the surrender of King John.

The family were Kentish gentry until Sir Thomas Fane (d 1589) made one of the most advantageous marriages of the Tudor period when he made his second wife Mary, daughter of Henry Nevill, 6th Baron Bergavenny. Mary was one of the great Tudor heiresses, she was the last heiress to the mediaeval House of Neville and one of England's largest landowners. Mary inherited the titles of Baron le Despenser and Baron Bergavenny from her father, whilst her son choose the title of Earl of Westmoreland when he was raised to that rank by James I of England. The original Neville Earldom of Westmoreland had been confiscated in 1571 from Mary Fane's cousin Charles Neville, 6th Earl of Westmorland for his part in the Rising of the North.

The family went on to produce over 50 Members of Parliament, as well soldiers, bankers, imperial administrators as well as some notable writers. The family married judiciously and inherited estates in Northamptonshire, Lincolnshire, Dorset, Somerset, Devon, Oxfordshire as well as retaining their original lands in Kent. Sir Francis Fane of Fulbeck was one of the founding investors in the Virginia Company that settled the new world and the family were also large landowners in Canada, mainly on Prince Edward Island, and South Africa, as well as having extensive business interests in India.

The family were much involved in India as administrators, employees of the East India company as well as soldiers. Two Indian regiments were raised by family members, including Fane's Horse, as well as producing a Commander-in-Chief of all British forces in India and the West Indies.

The family owned a number of family seats, including:

 Apethorpe Hall, Northamptonshire
 Mereworth Castle, Kent
 Fulbeck Hall, Lincolnshire
 Wormsley Park, Oxfordshire
 Basildon Park, Berkshire
 Osterley Park, Middlesex
 Brympton d'Evercy, Somerset
 Clovelly, Devon
 Avon Tyrell, Hampshire

See also
 Fane (surname)
 Vane (surname)

References
 The Gentleman's magazine, Volume 94, Part 1 p. 180
 Collins's peerage of England; genealogical, biographical, and ..., Volumes 3 and 4
 Debrett's complete peerage of the United Kingdom of Great Britain and Ireland
 Encyclopædia Britannica: or, A dictionary of arts, sciences, and ..., Volume 10
 London Gazette: no. 28469, p. 1470, 24 February 1911.
 Calendar of Sales at Sotheby's retrieved 10 May 2007

 
English families